Denis Charvet (born 12 May 1962 in Cahors) is a former French rugby union player. He played as a centre.
Denis Charvet played for Stade Toulousain and Racing Club de France. He earned his first national cap on March 1, 1986 against  Wales at Cardiff. He played all the five games at the 1987 Rugby World Cup, where France lost the final to New Zealand by 29-9.

Honours 
 Grand Slam : 1987
 French rugby champion, 1985, 1986, 1989 with Stade Toulousain
 Challenge Yves du Manoir1988 with Stade Toulousain

External links 
 

1962 births
Living people
French rugby union players
Stade Toulousain players
France international rugby union players
Rugby union centres
People from Cahors
Sportspeople from Lot (department)
Stade Français players
Racing 92 players